Women's Slalom World Cup 1980/1981

Final point standings

In Women's Slalom World Cup 1980/81 the best 5 results count. Deductions are given in brackets.

Women's Slalom Team Results

All points were shown including individual deduction.  Bold indicates highest score - italics indicate race wins.

References
 fis-ski.com

World Cup
FIS Alpine Ski World Cup slalom women's discipline titles